Spitta is a surname. Notable people with the surname include:

Friedrich Spitta (1852–1924), German Protestant theologian
Heinrich Spitta (1902–1972), German music educator
Philipp Spitta (1841–1894), German music historian and musicologist 
Philipp Spitta (poet) (1801–1859), German Protestant religious poet